The Knockout Stage of the 1995 Fed Cup Asia/Oceania Zone Group I was the final stage of the Zonal Competition involving teams from Asia and Oceania. Those that qualified for this stage placed first and second in their respective pools.

The four teams were then randomly drawn into a two-stage knockout tournament, with the winner advancing to the World Group II Play-offs.

Draw

Semifinals

South Korea vs. Hong Kong

China vs. Thailand

Final

South Korea vs. China

  advanced to the World Group II Play-offs, where they were drawn against . However, they lost 2–3, and thus returned to the Asia/Oceania Zone Group I in 1996.

See also
Fed Cup structure

References

External links
 Fed Cup website

1995 Fed Cup Asia/Oceania Zone